Kellerman Log Cabin is a historic home located at Conesus in Livingston County, New York. It is a one-story, 20 foot by 24 foot building with a large partially exposed fieldstone chimney.  It is constructed of stacked adzed logs with dovetail corner joints and mud chinking. It was built in 1816 by Isaac Kellerman.  It is a rare settlement era log cabin, and one of five surviving log cabins in the upper Genesee Valley.  In 1978, it was moved from its original site to a public park and now houses Ganeasos History Keepers, a local history organization.

It was listed on the National Register of Historic Places in 2007.

References

External links
Kellerman Log Cabin, Conesus, New York, USA - Pre-Victorian Historic Homes on Waymarking.com

Houses on the National Register of Historic Places in New York (state)
Log cabins in the United States
Houses completed in 1816
Houses in Livingston County, New York
1816 establishments in New York (state)
National Register of Historic Places in Livingston County, New York
Log buildings and structures on the National Register of Historic Places in New York (state)